Cow Run is an unincorporated community in Washington County, in the U.S. state of Ohio.

History
A post office called Cow Run was established in 1869, and remained in operation until 1916. The community took its name from nearby Cow Run.

References

Unincorporated communities in Washington County, Ohio
Unincorporated communities in Ohio